The Biermanskool Reformed Church was a congregation of the Reformed Churches in South Africa (GKSA) in Namibia, until 2016 when it left the denomination. The congregation is based in the oldest GKSA building still in use in Namibia.

Beginnings 
The Biermanskool congregation was founded in 1955 as the Vanjaarsveld Reformed Church, probably named after Dm. H.S. van Jaarsveld, who founded the first GKSA church in South West Africa in 1930. In 1961, the name was changed to Outjo-Wes, but in 1985, it finally received its current name. The congregation's church lies on the Urumbe farm near Kamanjab. (The latter town had its own congregation, the Kamanjab Reformed Church, from 1969 to 1977, but its origin and history is poorly understood.) A school operated for the children of GKSA worshippers here, named as the congregation eventually would be for a Monsignor Bierman, who depending on the source was either an education inspector for the church or an administrator for the SWA government.

There was no church there at Urumbe farm; therefore, the local GKSA folk, mostly descended from those on the Dorsland Trek who were repatriated to SWA from 1928-1930. A canvas tent was used at first, later followed by the schoolhouse refectory. At the time, the area around the farm was considered the Vanjaarsveld district of the Outjo Reformed Church.

Church building 
Around 1948, work began on a church building for the Vanjaarsveld district under the architect Max Ecker, a German who had retired there. Danie Oosthuizen was chairman of the building committee. The district collected £230 for building the edifice. According to legend, a member took the money to buy cattle and a windmill for himself, and was then forced to pay for the building, completed in 1949, out of his own pocket. Dm. J.W.J. van Ryssen, pastor for the Outjo church from 1949 to 1953, presided over the opening in February 1949.

In the centennial year of the GKSA (1959), the Vanjaarsveld congregation had 91 confirmed members. By the end of 1997, there were only 25, but the number had rebounded to 45 by the end of 2014. Biermanskool had been grouped with Outjo, Aranos, Otjiwarongo, Namib-Kus, and Khomas-Hoogland were grouped under the Klassis Waterberg, while the other 12 Namibian congregations formed Klassis Etosha. In 2016, all the Waterberg churches, save for Otjiwarongo which joined Etosha, left the GKSA.

Pastors 
 Van Dalsen, Dr. Hubrecht Anthonie, 1957–1959 (together with Outjo); 1959–1930 (together with Outjo and Usakos); 1961–1964 (together with Outjo and Walvis Bay)
 Putter, Christiaan Johannes Jacobus, 1970–1982 (together with Outjo and Kamanjab)
 Aucamp, Jan Christoffel, 1983–1985 (together with Outjo)
 Franck, Jules Edgard, 1986–1992 (together with Outjo)
 Scheepers, Lucas Cornelius, 1993–1998 (together with Outjo)
 Venter, Petrus Jacobus, 1999–2002 (together with Outjo and Otjiwarongo)
 Prinsloo, Daniël Petrus (Neil), 2003–2014 (together with Outjo and Otjiwarongo)
 Erasmus, Marthinus Johannes Jacobus, 2015 – hede (in kombinasie met Outjo)

Sources 
 (af) Kerkgebou staan al 61 jaar, Republikein, 15 April 2010. URL accessed 29 November 2015.
 (af) Harris, C.T., Hannes Noëth, Sarkady, N.G., Schutte, F.M. and Van Tonder, J.M. 2010. Van seringboom tot kerkgebou: die argitektoniese erfenis van die Gereformeerde Kerke. Potchefstroom: Administratiewe Buro.
 (af) Schalekamp, M.E. (chairman: editing commission). 2001. Die Almanak van die Gereformeerde Kerke in Suid-Afrika vir die jaar 2002. Potchefstroom: Administratiewe Buro.
 (af) Van der Walt, S.J. (chairman: almanac deputies). 1997. Die Almanak van die Gereformeerde Kerke in Suid-Afrika vir die jaar 1998. Potchefstroom: Administratiewe Buro.
 (af) Ammi Venter (ed.) 1957. Almanak van die Gereformeerde Kerk in Suid-Afrika vir die jaar 1958. Potchefstroom: Administratiewe Buro.
 (af) Venter, A.A. (chief ed.) 1958. Almanak van die Gereformeerde Kerk in Suid-Afrika vir die jaar 1959. Potchefstroom: Administratiewe Buro.
 (af) Vogel, Willem (ed.). 2014. Die Almanak van die Gereformeerde Kerke in Suid-Afrika vir die jaar 2015. Potchefstroom: Administratiewe Buro.

Afrikaner culture in Namibia
Kunene Region
Churches in Namibia
1955 establishments in South West Africa
Christian organizations established in 1955
Protestantism in Namibia
Reformed Churches in South Africa